Frants Diderik Bøe (28 May 1820 - 13 November 1891) was a Norwegian painter, who specialized in still life and landscapes.

Biography
Frants Diderik Bøe was born and grew up in Bergen, Norway, as the second oldest of seven siblings. Encouraged by the local artistic community, including Johan Christian Dahl, he moved to Copenhagen where he enrolled in the Royal Danish Academy of Fine Arts. There he studied with the architect Gustav Friedrich Hetsch and  sculptor Herman Wilhelm Bissen. He also trained with artist, Christen Købke.  In 1849, he moved to Paris, where he studied under the expatriate Danish painter Theude Grønland (1817-1876). Starting in 1852, his vision became impaired from eye disease which would come to effect his later works.

After eight years in Paris, he returned to Norway.  He lived in Nordland from 1858 to 1861 and from 1863 to 1864, principally painting landscapes and scenes from nature. He married Hanna Maria Arnesen, a teacher from Lofoten, in 1864.  Later that year, the couple moved to Bergen where he lived the rest of his life. 
His work is featured in several public art museums, principally within Norway.  Notable collections are featured at the National Gallery in Oslo,  Bergen Billedgalleri and Oscarshall in Oslo.

Awards
Honorable Mention - Salonen Paris, 1852 
Silver and bronze medal - Exposition Universelle. 1855 
Medal - Wien World Exhibition, 1873

Gallery

References

Other sources
Dietrichson, Lorentz (1991) Norges kunsts historie i det nittende arhundre (Oslo: Messel Forlag AS)

External links
Frants Diderik Bøe (NiceArtGallery.com)
Frants Diderik Bøe (Galleri Lofotens Hus)
Frants Diderik Bøe - Norwegian Still Life painter (Fine Art)

1820 births
1891 deaths
19th-century Norwegian painters
Artists from Bergen
Royal Danish Academy of Fine Arts alumni
Norwegian male painters
19th-century Norwegian male artists